Papyrus 106 (in the Gregory-Aland numbering), designated by , is a copy of the New Testament in Greek. It is a papyrus manuscript of the Gospel of John, containing verses 1:29-35 & 1:40-46 in a fragmentary condition. The manuscript has been paleographically assigned to the early 3rd century.  The manuscript is currently housed at the Sackler Library (Papyrology Rooms, shelf number P. Oxy. 4445) at Oxford.

Description
The original manuscript would've been around 12.5 cm x 23 cm, with about 35 lines per page. Due to pagination being extant (gamma/Γ (=3) on the front and delta/Δ (=4) on the reverse of the leaf), this indicates that the manuscript was either a single codex of John, or had John at the beginning of a collection.

Textual Variants
John 1:30:
υπερ :     * B C* W pc
περι :  A C L Θ Ψ 0101 ƒ ƒ 33 ; Epiph
περη : C

John 1:31
εγω ηλθον :  C*,
ηλθον εγω :     A B 

John 1:32 (1)
λεγων
omit. :  *
incl. :     A B C

John 1:32 (2)
καταβαινον ως περιστεραν :    A B C
καταβαινον ωσει περιστερὰν :  K P Δ 0101 ƒ ƒ 700 892 1241 1424 l 2211 pm
ως περιστεραν καταβαινον : 

John 1:32 (3)
εξ :     A B Cת 
εκ του : 

John 1:32 (4)
εμεινεν :     A B Cת 
μενον : 

John 1:34
εκλεκτος :   * b e ff Syriac Curetonian (sy). 
 (υιος) :    A B C D W Θ Ψ 083

John 1:41
ουτος
omit. : 
incl. :    A B 

John 1:42 (1)
ηγαγεν :  *   B L 579 pc b
ουτος ηγαγεν : {{sup|c G ƒ pc bo; Epiph
και ηγαγεν : A W Θ Ψ ƒ 33  lat sy

John 1:42 (2)
προς  (ιησουν) : 
προς τον  (ιησουν) :    A B 

John 1:42 (3)
εμβλεψας :  *  A B K L Γ Ψ ƒ 565 579 700 pm sy
εμβλεψας δε :  Δ Θ ƒ 33 892 1241 1424 pm lat syh** sa bo
και εμβλεψας : W pc a e q sy

John 1:42 (4)
ειπεν :     A 
ειπε : B
ειπεν αυτω : 

John 1:42 (5)
ιωαννου :     B* L W 33 pc it co
ιωαννα : Θ 1241 pc vg
ιωνα : A B Ψ ƒ ƒ  c q vg sy bo; Epiph

John 1:42 (6)
ο :     B 
ος : A Θ W

John 1:43 (1)
εξελθειν :      A B 
εξελθιν : *

John 1:43 (2)
γαλιλαιαν :     A B 
γαλειλαιαν : B*

John 1:43 (3)
ευρισκει :      A B 
ευρισκι : 

John 1:43 (4)
λεγει :    A B 
λεγι : 

John 1:43 (5)
ο / (ιησους) :     A B 
 (ιησους) : *

John 1:44 (1)
ην δε ο φιλιππος :     A B 
ην φιλιππος : *

John 1:44 (2)
βηθσαιδα :     A B 
βηθσαιδαν :  *
βηδσαιδα : *

John 1:44 (3)
εκ της πολεως :     A B 
της πολεως : *

John 1:44 (4)
του ανδρεου : 
ανδρεου :    A B 

John 1:45 (1)
 (υιον) :     B 33 579 l 2211 pc; Or
τον  (υιον) : A L (W,) Θ Ψ ƒ ƒ ; Or

John 1:45 (2)
του ιωσηφ :     A 
ιωσηφ : B
του ισηφ : *

John 1:45 (3)
ναζαρεθ :   
ναζαρετ :   A B

John 1:46 (1)
και
incl. :    A B 
omit. : 

John 1:46 (2)
ναζαρετ :   A B
ναζαρεθ :

See also 

 List of New Testament papyri
 Oxyrhynchus Papyri

References

Further reading 

 W. E. H. Cockle, The Oxyrhynchus Papyri LXV (London: 1998), pp. 11–14.

External links

Images 
 P.Oxy.LXIV 4445 from Papyrology at Oxford's "POxy: Oxyrhynchus Online" 
  recto 
  verso

Official registration 
 "Continuation of the Manuscript List" Institute for New Testament Textual Research, University of Münster. Retrieved April 9, 2008

New Testament papyri
3rd-century biblical manuscripts
Early Greek manuscripts of the New Testament
4445
Gospel of John papyri